The Halle Range or Halle Mountains is a mountain range in Clavering Island, King Christian X Land, northeastern Greenland. Administratively this range is part of the Northeast Greenland National Park zone.

The range was named by Lauge Koch during his 1929–30 expedition after Thore Gustav Halle (1884–1964), a professor at the University of Stockholm who had worked on the plant samples brought by the expedition. Formerly it had been also known as Joh. H. Andresenfjellet.

Geography
The Halle Range is an up to 1200 m high little glaciated mountain massif located in the southwest part of Clavering Island (Clavering Ø). Its average elevation is 912 m and the highest point of the range is 1272 m high Bramsen Bjerg. The Vildbækdalen is a valley in the heart of the range. The area of the Halle mountains is uninhabited.

Mountains

 Bramsen Bjerg
 Brinkley Bjerg
 Dunken
 Eiger
 Forposten
 Gedderyggen
 Hjertet
 Højnålen
 Kisbjerg
 Langelinie
 Moltke Bjerg
 Monucleus
 Ortlerspids
 Pladen
 Skårene
 Steinmannspids
 Trinucleus
 Vestmar Bjerg
 Vesttinden
 Østtinden

See also
List of mountain ranges of Greenland

References

Mountain ranges of Greenland